Pierre de Bousquet de Florian was the head of the newly formed French National Centre for Counter Terrorism, an agency charged with monitoring and preventing terrorism in France, from the agency's establishment in 2017 to before being succeeded by Laurent Nuñez in 2020.  Bousquet also headed the Direction de la surveillance du territoire from 2002-2007. Since leaving public service he has moved into the private sector in a senior advisory role at a consultancy firm.

References

1954 births
Living people
Paris 2 Panthéon-Assas University alumni
Sciences Po alumni
École nationale d'administration alumni
French civil servants
Officiers of the Légion d'honneur
Officiers of the Ordre des Arts et des Lettres
Officers of the Ordre du Mérite Maritime
Commanders of the Ordre national du Mérite
People from Boulogne-Billancourt